Ostrander may refer to:

People
 Arthur Frederick Ostrander (1895–1978), scientist
 B. R. Ostrander (1843–1922), politician 
 Elaine Ostrander, geneticist
 Fannie Ostrander (died 1921) was an American writer.
 Isabel Ostrander (1883–1924), author
 James W. Ostrander, politician
 John Ostrander (born 1949), author
 Josh Ostrander, singer-songwriter
 Linda Woodaman Ostrander (born 1937), composer
 Rick Ostrander, academic
 Russell C. Ostrander (1851–1919), American jurist
 T. C. Ostrander (born 1985), American football player

Places

United States
 Ostrander, Minnesota 
 Ostrander, Ohio
 Ostrander, Washington
 Ostrander, Wisconsin, unincorporated community
 Ostrander Lake, in Yosemite National Park
 Ostrander Lake (Michigan)